André Bouys (1656–1740) was a French portrait painter and mezzotint engraver.

Biography
Bouys was born at Hyères about the year 1656. He studied under François de Troy, and acquired sufficient reputation to gain admission into the Academy in 1688, when he presented a portrait of the painter Charles de La Fosse, now at Versailles, where there are likewise two portraits of himself, one of them representing also his first wife. He died in Paris in 1740, having engraved several portraits, among which are the following:

Andre Bonys and his first Wife.
Francois de Troy, painter.
Claude Gros, de Boze; And. Boys pinx. ad vivum. 1708.
François Rene, Marquis de Bellay; Boys pinx.
Jean Baptiste Massillon, Bishop of Clermont; Boys fec.
Marin Marais, famous musician. (pictured)

References

External links
 

17th-century French painters
French male painters
18th-century French painters
17th-century French engravers
18th-century French engravers
Year of birth unknown
1740 deaths
People from Hyères
French portrait painters
1656 births
18th-century French male artists